The Nutritional Health Alliance is an industry lobby group which lobbies United States lawmakers to pass industry friendly health legislation.

The Nutritional Health Alliance was formed in 1992 by the supplement industry "to mount a forceful campaign to evade studies of their products."  Gerald Kessler, president of Nature's Plus, was the first head. Flyers were sent to health food stores with such titles as "The FDA wants to put you out of Business" and "Don't Let the FDA Take Your Vitamins Away".

The Nutritional Health Alliance is best known for its involvement in the Nutritional Health Alliance vs. Shalala case.  In this case Nutritional Health Alliance argued to the second circuit that the U.S. Food and Drug Administration (FDA) mandating health claims on dietary supplements violated manufacturer's First Amendment rights.

See also
Nutrition Labeling and Education Act

References

External links
Official site
Nutritional Health Alliance v. Shalala, 953 F.Supp. 526 (S.D.N.Y., 1997) Challenge, on First Amendment grounds, the NLEA framework requiring advanced FDA authorization for health claims made on vitamin labels.
 Nutritional Health Alliance at OpenSecrets

Health law in the United States
Lobbying organizations in the United States